Insaaf is a 2011 Maldivian action drama film directed by Yoosuf Shafeeu. Produced by Ismail Shafeeq under Eupe Productions, the film stars Ahmed Saeed, Yoosuf Shafeeu, Ahmed Ziya, Ibrahim Jihad and Mohamed Manik in pivotal roles. The film was released on 29 November 2011. The film revolves around the disputes between two districts of an island.

Cast 
 Yoosuf Shafeeu as Aiman
 Mohamed Manik as Mac
 Ahmed Saeed as Zareer
 Ibrahim Jihad as Shavin
 Ahmed Ziya as Naabe
 Ajunaz Ali as Affaal
 Abdulla Naseer as Bodube
 Mariyam Shahuza as Sausan
 Inad Thaufeeq as SP Police
 Aminath Ziyadha as Nuzu
 Mohmaed Rifshan as Ammadey
 Ahmed Rifau as Battey
 Umar Ashfaq as Manik

Soundtrack

Release and response
Insaaf was initially slated for release on 22 November 2011, but pushed for a 29 November 2011 release on public demand, since a majority of the audience were on vacation during holidays. Upon release, the film received mixed to positive reviews from critics. Ahmed Nadheem from Haveeru praised the performance of Mohamed Manik and Ahmed Saeed while criticizing the work of Yoosuf Shafeeu: "It is evident Shafeeu has put so much effort into developing the characters of the film, but he forgot to develop his own character". Summing up his review, Nadheem labelled as a "different" film and warned audience about extra use of "shaky-camera" which might cause dizziness.

Accolades

References

2011 films
Maldivian action drama films
Films directed by Yoosuf Shafeeu
2011 action drama films
Dhivehi-language films